The National Exhibition Centre (NEC) is an exhibition centre located in Marston Green, Solihull, West Midlands, England. It is near junction 6 of the M42 motorway, and is adjacent to Birmingham Airport and Birmingham International railway station. It was opened by  Queen Elizabeth II in 1976.

History
The NEC was originally going to be built adjacent to the M1 motorway (junction 21) near Leicester but it was turned down by Leicestershire County Council with claims that "The big shows won't move away from London". The building was designed by Edward Mills.

In November 1971, the Secretary of State for the Environment granted outline planning approval for the National Exhibition Centre in Birmingham. On 16 February 1973, then Prime Minister Edward Heath travelled up from London to cut a white ribbon and initiate its construction. The NEC was opened by Queen Elizabeth II on 2 February 1976.

Expansion of the complex
The seventh hall of the NEC complex, a multi-purpose indoor arena named the Birmingham International Arena (currently branded Resorts World Arena), opened in December 1980.

On 23 March 1989, Queen Elizabeth II opened three new halls. Four more halls were added in 1993, and another four new halls, designed by Seymour Harris and built by John Laing, were completed in January 1998.

A five-year, £40 million venue improvement programme which saw improvements made to everything from the car parking to signage, seating and catering was carried out between 2006 and 2011.

Exhibitions
The NEC has 20 interconnected halls covering  of floor space. Regular exhibitions in the past have included the British International Motor Show and the international dog show Crufts.

The NEC has 16,500 parking spaces spread around the site, with a shuttle bus service operating to and from the car parks. In 2020 the all-day parking fee for public exhibitions was £16.00.

NEC Group
Parent company the NEC Group also owns and operates the Arena Birmingham and ICC Birmingham, both in central Birmingham, and the Resorts World Arena, based on The NEC site. Birmingham City Council placed the NEC Group up for sale in 2014. After short-listing three contenders to purchase the company, the sale to Lloyds Development Capital, the private equity unit of Lloyds Banking Group, was completed in January 2015 for £307 million.  In October 2018, Blackstone acquired NEC Group from Lloyds Development Capital, paying around £800 million for the group.

Emergency hospital

From early April 2020 the NEC housed NHS Nightingale Hospital Birmingham, an emergency hospital scheduled to open on 10 April, and receive its first patients on 12 April, as part of a network of NHS Nightingale Hospitals in response to the COVID-19 pandemic. On 1 April 2021 the hospital was closed without ever treating a patient.

Gallery

References

External links

 
 The NEC Birmingham Business event calendar

Indoor arenas in England
Exhibition and conference centres in England
Buildings and structures completed in 1976
Buildings and structures in Birmingham, West Midlands
Buildings and structures in Solihull
Esports venues in the United Kingdom
London Spitfire
2022 Commonwealth Games venues
Table tennis at the 2022 Commonwealth Games
Weightlifting at the 2022 Commonwealth Games
Boxing at the 2022 Commonwealth Games
Badminton at the 2022 Commonwealth Games
Powerlifting at the 2022 Commonwealth Games